Boraspati ni Tano or Boraspati, also known as Ilik, is the earth deity in Batak mythology. Boraspati ni Tano is represented as a tokay gecko. Images of Boraspati (or Beraspati in Karo culture) can be found decorating the door of a Batak Karo and Batak Toba buildings as well as other Batak objects e.g. the cover of the pustaha or the pupuk container naga morsarang.

Mythology
Boraspati ni Tano is the Earth deity in Batak mythology representing fertility, wealth and the underworld. The name Boraspati ni Tano is borrowed from Sanskrit Brihaspati, a Hindu astrological representation of Jupiter and the day of the week Thursday. 

Boraspati ni Tano is one of the most important personification of natural forces of Batak's cosmology, together with Boru Saniang Naga (water deity). While Boraspati ni Tano is a male god of the earth and the underworld, Boru Saniang Naga is a serpentine female water deity who personified the storm, the sea, the spring water and other weather elements that are especially dangerous for the fishermen. Boraspati ni Tano is responsible for the fertility of the land. Because of this, Boraspati ni Tano was frequently mentioned in the public invocations (Batak ) as a very important figure. Boraspati ni Tano was invoked in the beginning before starting any kind of works e.g. village founding and establishing houses (specifically when the offering-pole was planted into the ground). The Batak deities, together with the ancestor spirits, are the focus of the animistic religion of Batak known as the Sipelebegu, adhered to the Batak people before the arrival of Islam and Christianity.

Astrology
The Bataks preserved their animistic Indonesian inheritance and ancestral pattern while borrowing little from their Islamic and Buddhist neighbors. Although the Bataks are now largely Christians, the Batak ritual calendar was still in regular use with some knowledge of older beliefs. The Batak calendar, known as the porhalaan, consisted of 12 or 13 lunisolar months of 30 days each. The days were named similarly with the naming of days in the Hindu calendar, borrowing the planetary names from the Hindu system. The days are repeated four times, with 2 additional days at the end. 

In Hinduism, Brihaspati is associated with Jupiter and the day of the week Thursday. The relation between Brihaspati and Boraspati showed how Hinduism influenced the animistic belief of Batak people.

Architecture

Boraspati magical motifs (Batak gorga) are often painted on the walls of a Batak house or a granary. Together with other motifs, they form a magic to invoke wealth and fertility into the house.

Reference

Cited works

See also

Rangkiang
Pustaha
Naga morsarang

Batak